Set You Free is the ninth studio album by American country music artist Gary Allan. It was released on January 22, 2013, by MCA Nashville., and is Allan's first number-one album on the Billboard 200 chart, debuting in the top spot on February 9, 2013. It is also Allan's second number-one album on the Top Country Albums chart, following 2005's Tough All Over. The album produced three singles: "Every Storm (Runs Out of Rain)", "Pieces", and "It Ain't the Whiskey".

Background 

Gary Allan talked to The Boot writer Vernell Hackett, and Allan commented on the time during making of this album was one of transition for his label. In addition, Allan noted how he worked with producers in a competitive effort to make this album better.

Title

Gary Allan talked to The Boot writer Vernell Hackett, and Allan mentioned the title came from the lead single from the album because it is what the effort as a whole is all about.

Theme

Gary Allan talked to The Boot writer Vernell Hackett, and Allan stated the album's songs are set to the arc of a relationship.

Commercial performance
On February 9, 2013, Set You Free was the most sold album in the United States by the Billboard 200 chart, as well as the most sold Country Album the same week on the charts. In addition, the album was the second most sold Digital Album, which it was the No. 13 most sold album in Canada, and this was all for this same week on the charts. As of March 6, 2013, the album has sold 219,000 copies.

Critical reception

Upon its release, Set You Free received generally positive reviews from most music critics. At Metacritic, which assigns a normalized rating out of 100 to reviews from mainstream critics, the album received an average score of 78, based on 7 reviews, which indicates "generally favorable reviews".

The album has garnered many positive reviews. Those came in from About.com, AllMusic, American Songwriter, The Boston Globe, Country Weekly, Entertainment Weekly, Got Country Online, The Plain Dealer, PopMatters, Rolling Stone, Roughstock, Taste of Country, and the USA Today. Stephen Thomas Erlewine of AllMusic gave the album a three-and-a-half-out-of-five-star rating, saying that the album is "one where all of his past is present in his assured professionalism." Likewise, American Songwriter music critic Alanna Conaway rated it the same, and wrote that "Set You Free will give his long-time followers more than they could have hoped for, while garnering new fans coast-to-coast." In addition, Stuart Munro of The Boston Globe also rated it the same, which is based on Metacritic's assigned score, and stated that "[Allan] may offer less of an alternative than he once did, but that old-school concern and a wider sonic palette keep Allan just this side of the mainstream." Similarly, Rolling Stone music critic Chuck Eddy gave it the same rating as well, and evoked how "the 45-year-old singer lets the crazy out" on the album. Furthermore, Dan MacIntosh of Roughstock even gave it the same exact rating and wrote that "Many of these song lyrics are intensely self-directed" that are meant for "that tragic guy at the end of the bar" and proclaimed how the album is "fun, but all over before you know it. Then you’re back to crying away your blues." Lastly, About.com music critic Robert Silva rated it the same himself, and noted how "Set You Free can use these jolts of energy, but Allan still seems at his best -- and definitely in his comfort zone -- when he's maudlin, morose, and three sheets to the wind."

The Plain Dealer'''s Chuck Yarborough graded the album a perfect A+ grade, and alluded to how "'Set You Free' boasts of the typical Allan sound – a sort of lonesome dove lament in his voice – but there’s also an in-your-face stab at belligerence called 'Bones' that runs contrary to form." Bob Paxman of Country Weekly gave the album an A grade and affirmed that "Set You Free doesn't sound like every other album coming out of the Nashville factory these days—and that's definitely a good thing." Paxman went on to describe how "[t]he album flows freely, again as the title might suggest, and the divergent styles truly complement one another." On the other hand, Grady Smith of Entertainment Weekly graded the album a B+ grade, and alluded to "how Gary Allan is beginning to let a small amount of sunshine in."

PopMatters' Matt Cibula give the album a seven-stars-out-of-ten rating and acclaimed that "[t]his album is the truth." Taste of Country's Billy Dukes rated the album even better, giving it a four-and-a-half-out-of-five. He noted how "[e]ach track is a surprise that pays off handsomely when the time is invested." Donna Block of Got Country Online rated in a perfect five-stars and evoked how "[i]t is said a picture is worth a thousand words," and saying, "Here the lyrics sketch out what the music (and Gary’s vocals) paints in bold, rich colors. Here is a mix of old and new country, blended with acceptance and hope throughout." Finally, USA Today'' music critic Brian Mansfield also rated it a perfect four star effort, and wrote, "It's a hard-won hope. Brooding songs, like the one where's he's digging a grave for an unsuspecting, unfaithful love, are as scary as hell." Mansfield concluded saying, "Gary Allan has [...] lived a life that most other country acts can, well, only sing about. That's why the cracks in Allan's voice convey experience, not affection, and why he doesn't have to sing about how country he is for everyone to know."

Track listing

Personnel

 Gary Allan – acoustic guitar, electric guitar, lead vocals, background vocals
 David Angell – violin
 Brian Arsenault – bass guitar
 Matt Billingslea – drums
 Tom Bukovac – acoustic guitar, electric guitar
 Perry Coleman – background vocals
 Chad Cromwell – drums
 Eric Darken – percussion
 David Davidson – violin
 Levi Dennis – fiddle, acoustic guitar, viola, background vocals
 Greg Droman – 12-string guitar, electric guitar
 Dan Dugmore – steel guitar
 Tim Galloway – electric guitar
 Kenny Greenberg – electric guitar
 Vicki Hampton – background vocals
 Jaime Hanna – acoustic guitar, background vocals
 Lee Hendricks – bass guitar
 Wes Hightower – background vocals
 Jedd Hughes – acoustic guitar, electric guitar
 Jay Joyce – acoustic guitar, electric guitar, background vocals
 John Lancaster – Hammond B-3 organ, keyboards, piano, Wurlitzer, background vocals
 Hillary Lindsey – background vocals 
 Rob McNelley – electric guitar
 Marilyn Martin – background vocals
 Steve Nathan – Hammond B-3 organ
 Russ Pahl – steel guitar
 Rachel Proctor – background vocals
 Giles Reaves – drums, Fender Rhodes, Hammond B-3 organ, percussion, piano, synthesizer, xylophone
 Michael Rhodes – bass guitar
 David Steele – acoustic guitar, electric guitar, background vocals
 Ilya Toshinsky – hi-string guitar, acoustic guitar, mandolin, ukulele
 C.J. Udeen – steel guitar
 Cindy Richardson-Walker – background vocals
 Matt Warren – harmonica
 Kris Wilkinson – viola, string arrangements 
 Craig Wright – drums, percussion

Charts

Weekly charts

Year-end charts

References

2013 albums
Gary Allan albums
MCA Records albums
Albums produced by Jay Joyce
Albums produced by Mark Wright (record producer)
Albums produced by Greg Droman